Sun Tan Ranch is a comedy western produced by Norwanda Pictures in 1948. Little is known about the film and its crew, not to mention whether a print of the film still exists. Like Norwanda's other 1948 production, No Time for Romance, the film featured an all-Black cast. It appears to have been shot in the summer of 1948 in Hollywood.

Cast 

 Mildred Boyd
 Byron & Beau
 Joel Fluellen
 Austin McCoy
 Bill Walker
 Eunice Wilson

References 

1940s musical films
1940s musical comedy films
1948 films